Talleh Zargeh (also known as Tall-e Zarkah and Tall Zarkeh) is a village in Mazu Rural District, Alvar-e Garmsiri District, Andimeshk County, Khuzestan Province, Iran. At the 2006 census, its population was 304, in 57 families.

References 

Populated places in Andimeshk County